Thunnus is a genus of ocean-dwelling, ray-finned bony fish from the mackerel family, Scombridae. More specifically, Thunnus is one of five genera which make up the tribe Thunnini – a tribe that is collectively known as the tunas. Also called the true tunas or real tunas, Thunnus consists of eight species of tuna (more than half of the overall tribe), divided into two subgenera.

Their coloring, metallic blue on top and shimmering silver-white on the bottom, helps camouflage them from above and below. All tunas are extremely strong swimmers, and the yellowfin tuna is known to reach speeds of up to  when pursuing prey. As with all tunas, members of this genus are warm-blooded, which is a rare trait among fish; this enables them to tolerate cold waters and to dive to deeper depths. Bluefin tunas, for example, are found in Newfoundland and Iceland, and also in the tropical waters of the Gulf of Mexico and the Mediterranean Sea, where some individuals go each year to spawn.

Due to overfishing, the range of this genus has declined significantly, having been effectively extirpated from the Black Sea, for example.

Taxonomy
The first written use of the word was by Homer.

Based on morphology and short-length mitochondrial DNA sequence data, the genus Thunnus is currently classified into two subgenera: Thunnus (Thunnus) (the bluefin group), and Thunnus (Neothunnus) (the yellowfin group). However this classification has been questioned by a recent phylogenetic analysis of nuclear DNA sequence data, which resolved different relationships among species and did not support the traditional definition of the bluefin and yellowfin groups. Specifically, these analyses substantiated the division of Pacific and Atlantic Tuna in two separate species and suggested that Bigeye Tuna were actually a member of subgenus Neothunnus, not subgenus Thunnus. Earlier nuclear ribosomal DNA phylogenetic reconstructions also showed similar results.

This genus has eight species in two subgenera:
 Subgenus Thunnus (Thunnus):
Albacore, T. alalunga (Bonnaterre, 1788)
 Southern bluefin tuna, T. maccoyii (Castelnau, 1872)
 Bigeye tuna, T. obesus (Lowe, 1839)
 Pacific bluefin tuna, T. orientalis (Temminck & Schlegel, 1844)
 Atlantic bluefin tuna, T. thynnus (Linnaeus, 1758)
 Subgenus Thunnus (Neothunnus):
 Yellowfin tuna, T. albacares (Bonnaterre, 1788)
 Blackfin tuna, T. atlanticus (Lesson, 1831)
 Longtail tuna, T. tonggol (Bleeker, 1851)

Species
Until recently,  seven Thunnus species were thought to exist, and Atlantic bluefin tuna and Pacific bluefin tuna were subspecies of a single species.  In 1999, Collette established that based on both molecular and morphological considerations, they are, in fact, distinct species.

|}

Overfishing
The worldwide demand for sushi and sashimi, coupled with increasing population growth, has resulted in global stocks of the species being overfished and bluefin is the most endangered and considered "a serious conservation concern". Complicating the efforts for sustainable management of bluefin fish stocks within national exclusive economic zones (EEZ) is bluefin migrate long distances and hunt in the midocean that is not part of any country's EEZ, so have been vulnerable to overfishing by multiple countries' fishing fleets. International agreements and conventions are good-faith agreements and are difficult to monitor or enforce. Though this fish has been farmed in captivity by the Japanese and by the Australians with the help of the Japanese, yields are lower than other farmed fish due to the slow growth rate of bluefin tuna, therefore keeping prices high. On December 30, 2012, a  bluefin tuna caught off northeastern Japan, was sold at the Tsukiji fish market in Tokyo for a record 155.4 million yen ($1.76 million) – a unit price of JP¥ 1.274 million/kg (US$3,600/lb).

References

Further reading
 Charles Clover. 2004. The End of the Line: How Overfishing Is Changing the World and What We Eat. Ebury Press, London.

External links 

 
 Nutritional benefits of tuna 
The International Commission for the Conservation of Atlantic Tunas

 
Marine fish genera
Extant Cenozoic first appearances